The Indigenous Nationals is a multi-sport event held annually between the 43 Australian universities and tertiary institutions. Overseen by UniSport Australia, the peak governing body of university sport in Australia. Only Indigenous Australians are allowed to comped.

History 
13 students of the Wollotuka Institute (University of Newcastle) were enrolled in a Diploma of Aboriginal Studies (Community Recreation). These students created the National Indigenous Tertiary Education Student Games (NITESG).

The University of Western Australia has been the most successful amongst competing universities in the Nationals, having achieved Overall Winner a total of seven times (2001, 2002, 2004, 2008, 2009 2013, 2014).

Results 

Source:

References

External links 
Indigenous Nationals - official website
Archived website

UniSport
Recurring sporting events established in 1996